Scopello may refer to:

 Scopello, a municipality in the Province of Vercelli, in the Italian Alps
 Scopello, Trapani, a frazione (section) of Castellammare del Golfo, in the Province of Trapani, Sicily
 Madeleine Scopello, French historian of religion